NASCAR on Speed was the brand name of Speed's coverage of NASCAR Sprint Cup Series practice sessions, qualifying sessions and a limited number of races, as well as Camping World Truck Series races that began in 2002. It was produced by Fox Sports. Pre-race coverage was usually by NASCAR RaceDay while post-race coverage was on NASCAR Victory Lane. Other programs, such as Speed Center and Wind Tunnel with Dave Despain also provided limited coverage of NASCAR related events. Starting in August 2013, Speed's coverage of NASCAR including RaceDay, Victory Lane and NASCAR Live! moved to Fox Sports 1.

Personalities

 Rick Allen (2003–2013) (now with NASCAR on NBC)
 Adam Alexander (2008–2013)
 Allen Bestwick (2002–2006) with NBC/TNT
 Steve Byrnes (2001–2013) (died in 2015)
 Matt Clark (2012–2013)
 Dave Despain (2003–2013) (now with MAVTV)
 Bob Dillner (2001–2013) (now with MAVTV)
 Ray Dunlap (2003–2013)
 Mike Joy (2001–2013)
 Chad Knaus (2006–2012)
 Larry McReynolds (2001–2013)
 Phil Parsons (2003–2013)
 John Roberts (2006–2013) (retired in 2018)
 Elliott Sadler (2005–2011)
 Hermie Sadler (2005–2011)
 Dorsey Schroeder (2003)
 Jimmy Spencer (2006–2013) (retired)
 Wendy Venturini (2006–2013)
 Krista Voda (2007–2013) (later with NBC until 2020)
 Kenny Wallace (2005–2013) (retired in 2018)
 Darrell Waltrip (2001–2013) (retired in 2019)
 Michael Waltrip (2004–2013)
 Rutledge Wood (2005–2013) (now with NBC)

References

Speed
Speed (TV network) original programming
2002 American television series debuts
2014 American television series endings